Graham Short, (born 4 July 1946) is a micro-artist, living and working in Birmingham, England. 

In 2012 his nine-month project 'Cutting Edge' showing the words "Nothing is Impossible" engraved along the sharp edge of a Wilkinson Sword razor blade attracted attention from the media, which led to him appearing in news features. During the same year he engraved a minuscule portrait of the Queen on a speck of gold inserted into the eye of a needle to celebrate the Diamond Jubilee of Queen Elizabeth II.

Career

After leaving school at the age of 15 with no qualifications, he signed up to a six-year apprenticeship at a stationery engraving company in Birmingham. He learned the art of copper-plate and steel die engraving for the stationery trade - producing embossed letterheads, business cards and wedding invitations.

When his apprenticeship had ended he started his own one-man business in Birmingham’s Jewellery Quarter where he spent his career creating stationery for banks, royal palaces, and perfume companies. In 1970 he started to attempt the engraving of The Lord's Prayer on the head of a pin. This developed into a 40-year project which was finished in 2010.  This was shown at the Art Lounge Gallery, in Birmingham's Mailbox shopping complex. His first Fine Art exhibition at Art Decor Gallery, Whalley, Lancashire,  in 2011 sold out within twenty minutes. This event was followed by a solo exhibition at the Clarendon Gallery, Mayfair, London. His exhibition at the Tony Huggins-Haig Galleries, Kelso, sold out within minutes.

In 2019, The Institute of Cancer Research (ICR) commissioned him to work in collaboration with the Poet Laureate, Simon Armitage. The Poet Laureate's entire 51-word poem was meticulously engraved onto a 20mm long and 10mm wide pill. The engraved tablet will be displayed permanently in the new Centre for Cancer Drug Discovery.

In 2020, Short was commissioned to work in collaboration with Brax La Rue, the watch company. Short’s microscopic engraving is the ‘hidden secret’ in the mechanism of just one limited edition timepiece. 

In 2021, contemporary art gallery The Soden Collection now represents Graham, exclusively.

Exhibitions

November 2012 -  'The Writers Collection' at Clarendon Fine Art Gallery, Mayfair, London, Short unveiled 'Fry's Delight' his latest piece in collaboration with TV Personality Stephen Fry.  This piece was later placed in a sale at Sotheby's, London to raise funds for English PEN, the charity that supports and represents imprisoned writers around the world.

October 2014 -  'Love, Life and Hope Exhibition' Platinum Galleries Northallerton.  Including the first viewing of 'In Flanders Fields' the First World War poem written by Lieutenant-Colonel John McCrae.

Religious pieces

During 2011 and 2012 Short continued to work on creating the impossible, and in 2013 completed the 'Five Pillars of Islam' (The foundation of the Islamic faith) as part of the Fusion collection. This collection of nine exquisite pieces fused together English, Arabic and Calligraphy to create one of the most important Islamic miniature bodies of artwork ever seen. The collection attracted interest from around the world and was viewed by over two thousand people whilst on display in Birmingham Central Mosque. 

In June 2013, Short was invited by Indian artist Nikki Anand, to introduce her 'Euphoria' solo exhibition to the British public for the first time at the Nehru Centre, London.

In June 2015, after four month's work, Short completed the engraving of the Khanda, on the point of a needle.

In August 2017, the 'Faith Exhibition' was shown in Kelso, Scotland, before being taken around Britain. Miniature engravings from Sikh, Islamic, Hindi, and Christian religions were shown. 'Otche Nash' the main prayer of the Russian Orthodox Church - engraved on the head of a gold pin measuring 2mm across, was on view to the public for the first time.

In April 2019 the '99 names of Allah' were engraved on the head of a gold pin measuring 2mm across. All 99 names are taken from verses of the Quran to describe Allah's attributes. This was a four-month project. 

In 2022, Short engraved what is believed to be the world's smallest nativity scene in the eye of a needle. This was exhibited at a Nativity Festival at St Laurence Church, Northfield, Birmingham.

His signature piece, the one he wants to be remembered for, was completed in January 2023 - The Lord's Prayer, engraved on a speck of gold, inserted into the eye of a needle.

Jane Austen £5 note Giveaway

In December 2016, Short engraved a portrait of writer Jane Austen on the transparent section of four polymer banknotes which were then circulated in a giveaway.

Classic quotes from Emma, Pride and Prejudice, and Mansfield Park have also been engraved onto the notes, around the writer's portrait.

The four notes were distributed across areas of Scotland, England, Wales and Northern Ireland.

The £5 note found in Northern Ireland was sent anonymously to the Tony Huggins-Haig gallery in Kelso by the finder. She asked that the note be given to a children’s charity. It was auctioned in London in December 2017 where it realised £5,000. The proceeds were donated to the BBC Children in Need charity. The auctioneers, Morton and Eden, waived their fees and donated this to the same charity.

Swimming

Swimming has been a major part of Short's life. In 2001 he set a new record in becoming the Champion for 200 metres butterfly at the European Masters Championships in Mallorca. He broke the British and European record in the 1500m Freestyle in the first session of the ASA National Masters Championships 2016 at Ponds Forge, Sheffield. He knocked nearly four seconds under the previous record time of 22:08.91. He swam 22:04.97 to claim gold in the 70-74 years age group.

Acting

In 2019 Short secured the part of Ned in the short film, Ned & Me. The film, sponsored by the British Film Industry is destined to be screened at the 2020 'This Is England Festival' in Rouen, France.  
The film has also been accepted for The Aesthetica Film Festival in York. It is also a BAFTA Qualifying Festival for British short films. At the 2021 FICBU International Film Festival in Spain, Short was awarded 'Best Actor' for his portrayal of Ned in 'Ned & Me'.

References

1946 births
Living people
Microminiature sculptors